Josephina (minor planet designation: 303 Josephina) is a large Main belt asteroid. It was discovered by Elia Millosevich on 12 February 1891 in Rome. It was first of his two asteroid discoveries. The other was 306 Unitas.

References

External links 
 
 

000303
Discoveries by Elia Millosevich
Named minor planets
18910212